Shalishah or Baal-Shalisha is a place of uncertain identification mentioned in the Book of Kings (2 Kings 4:42) and the Talmud (Sanhedrin 12a). 

Baal-Shalisha is translated as "lord or master of three things", or "the third idol, the third husband; or, that governs or presides over three" (Baal=lord/master; Shalisha="three things", "third", or "three"). This ancient place name is preserved in the Arabic name of the modern village of Kafr Thulth. 

According to Eusebius and Jerome, Baal-Shalisha was located 15 (Roman) miles north of Diopolis (Lydda). Eusebius identified it with Bathsarisa. Another candidate for Shalishah is Serisiyyah, a now ruinous location west of Mount Ephraim, and yet another possibility is Khurbet Kefr Thulth (with Arabic Thulth comparable to the Hebrew Shalisha) which is roughly northeast of there. The Talmud identifies it as the earliest place each year for fruits to ripen.

Notes

References

Bibliography

Hebrew Bible places